Matvei Viktorovich Matveyev (born 9 April 1993) is a Russian football defender.

Club career
Matveyev made his debut in the Russian Second Division for FC KAMAZ Naberezhnye Chelny on 21 July 2012 in a game against FC Spartak Yoshkar-Ola.

References

External links
 
 

1993 births
Living people
Russian footballers
Association football defenders
FC KAMAZ Naberezhnye Chelny players
FC Okzhetpes players
FC Orsha players
Russian Second League players
Kazakhstan Premier League players
Belarusian First League players
Russian expatriate footballers
Expatriate footballers in Kazakhstan
Expatriate footballers in Belarus